Casares is a town and municipality in Spain, located in Málaga province, in the autonomous community of Andalusia.

Geography and demography

The municipality has a population of 4,051 (male: 2,139, female: 1,912), an area of 160 km². It has a  density of 25.3.

The municipality borders Estepona, Manilva, and Gaucín.

The town of Casares has Moorish cliff-hugging buildings.

History

In Roman times the spa of la Hedionda, located on the road to Manilva, was already well known, and this is where Julius Caesar supposedly was cured of a liver complaint, thanks to the sulfuric waters that still pour out of the local spring. For this reason, during the Roman Empire, Casares was allowed by emperors to mint its own coins.

The 12th-century castle, around which grew the present town center, was founded by the occupying Moors. In 1361, Peter I of Castile and the dethroned Muhammed V signed the Pact of Casares, by which the Moorish King recuperated his throne, leaving Casares as part of the Nasrid dynasty. The town surrendered to the Catholic forces after the fall of Ronda in 1485 and was handed over to Rodrigo Ponce de León, Duke of Cádiz. Later during the Rebellion of the Moriscos, Rodrigo's descendant, the Duke of Arcos, accepted the surrender of the rebel Moriscos, the Moors who had "converted" to Christianity. Casares had taken an active part in the Morisco rebellion, put down by Don John of Austria. The town separated from Manilva in 1795, being granted the title of Villa. At a later period, Casares was the only town, apart from Cádiz, that the Napoleonic troops had not been able to take.

More recent history indicates the old village as the birthplace of the father of Andalusian nationalism, Blas Infante Pérez de Vargas, labor lawyer, politician and writer, who is considered to be the largest historic figure in Andalusia. He was born in 1885 and died during the civil struggle in 1936.

Since 1978 the historical and artistic heritage of the village has been officially protected.

Celebrations 

The main fair (Feria) of Casares takes place during the first weekend in August. The day of the patron saint, the Virgen del Rosario, is celebrated in the first week in September, and in the middle of this month too is the Feria del Cristo. The most important of the Romero takes place the last Saturday in May.

Local administration
The mayor of Casares is José Carrasco Martínez, of Izquierda Unida–Los Verdes–Convocatoria por Andalucía. This coalition has seven councillors in the town's ayuntamiento, while the Spanish Socialist Workers' Party have two and People's Party another two.

Elections
In the 2016 Spanish General Election, the Spanish Socialist Workers' Party got 31% of the vote in Casares, closely challenged by coalition of Podemos, Izquierda Unida and Equo with 27.43% and by the Partido Popular with 24.65%.

Notable natives
Blas Infante

References

https://resultados.elpais.com/resultats/eleccions/2016/generals/congreso/01/29/41.html in Spanish

External links
 Casares information website | Ayuntamiento de Casares
 Aerial view of Casares, Málaga, Spain. (Google maps)
 Panoramic photo of Casares 
 Casares Walks

Municipalities in the Province of Málaga